An indirect election for the position of President of the Hellenic Republic was held by the Hellenic Parliament on 8 February 2000.

Incumbent President Konstantinos Stephanopoulos was elected on the first ballot with 269 votes out of 298, with the support of the two major parties, the ruling PASOK and New Democracy, against 10 votes for Synaspismos' candidate Leonidas Kyrkos. The 19 MPs of the Communist Party of Greece and DIKKI voted "present", and two were absent. Stephanopoulos' re-election to the presidency marked the first time in the history of the Third Hellenic Republic that the ruling party and the main opposition party both supported the same candidate, as well as the first time that an incumbent President was re-elected.

References

2000
2000 in Greek politics
2000 elections in Greece
February 2000 events in Europe